Omoglymmius monteithi is a species of beetle in the subfamily Rhysodidae. It was described by R.T. & J.R. Bell in 1992.

References

monteithi
Beetles described in 1992